Sayani Gupta (born 9 October 1985) is an Indian actress who appears in Hindi films. A graduate from the Film and Television Institute of India, she made her feature film debut in 2012 in Second Marriage Dot Com. She has since appeared in supporting roles in films such as Fan (2016), Jolly LLB 2 (2017) and Article 15 (2019). She essayed the role of a blind Pakistani-Bangladeshi lesbian activist named Khanum in Margarita with a Straw opposite Kalki Koechlin.

Early life and education
Gupta was born on 9 October 1985 in Calcutta (now Kolkata) in West Bengal. She graduated from the Film and Television Institute of India.

Filmography

Films

Web series

Short films

Singer
As a singer, she sang "Kahab To" in Article 15. She also served background vocals on most of the Four More Shots Please soundtrack.

References

External links

Living people
1985 births
Indian film actresses
Actresses in Hindi cinema
People from Kolkata
Film and Television Institute of India alumni
21st-century Indian actresses